Below are the squads for the Football at the 1985 Pan Arab Games, hosted by Rabat, Morocco, and took place between 4 and 16 August 1985.

Group A

Mauritania

Morocco
Coach:  José Faria

|-----
! colspan="7" bgcolor="#B0D3FB" align="left" |
|----- bgcolor="#DFEDFD"

|-----
! colspan="7" bgcolor="#B0D3FB" align="left" |
|----- bgcolor="#DFEDFD"

|-----
! colspan="7" bgcolor="#B0D3FB" align="left" |
|----- bgcolor="#DFEDFD"

Somalia

Tunisia

Group B

Algeria B
Coach: 

|-----
! colspan="7" bgcolor="#B0D3FB" align="left" |
|----- bgcolor="#DFEDFD"

|-----
! colspan="7" bgcolor="#B0D3FB" align="left" |
|----- bgcolor="#DFEDFD"

|-----
! colspan="7" bgcolor="#B0D3FB" align="left" |
|----- bgcolor="#DFEDFD"

North Yemen

Saudi Arabia
Coach: Khalil Al-Zayani

|-----
! colspan="7" bgcolor="#B0D3FB" align="left" |
|----- bgcolor="#DFEDFD"

|-----
! colspan="7" bgcolor="#B0D3FB" align="left" |
|----- bgcolor="#DFEDFD"

|-----
! colspan="7" bgcolor="#B0D3FB" align="left" |
|----- bgcolor="#DFEDFD"

United Arab Emirates

Group C

Iraq B
Coach: Anwar Jassam

Libya

Syria

References 

1985